Getting Free is a novel by British author Nigel Hinton that was first published in 1978. It tells the story of a teenage couple who ran away when they discovered they were expectant parents and to escape from an abusive and disapproving father.

Concept
Hinton had neighbours who were famous mountain climbers, a young couple who were into things that he was not. He decided that writing about the couple would be good for him.

References

1978 British novels
Oxford University Press books
Novels by Nigel Hinton